Monika Mariola Drybulska-Stefanowicz (born May 15, 1980 in Wągrowiec) is a Polish marathon runner. She set her personal best time of 2:29:57 at the 2003 Berlin Marathon. Drybulska also competed in the women's marathon at the 2004 Summer Olympics in Athens, but did not finish the race.

At the 2008 Summer Olympics in Beijing, Drybulska made her second appearance in the women's marathon, along with her compatriot Dorota Gruca. Unlike her previous Olympics, Drybulska successfully finished the race in twenty-fourth place by one second behind world-record holder Paula Radcliffe of Great Britain, with her seasonal best time of 2:32:39.

References

External links

NBC 2008 Olympics profile

Living people
1980 births
People from Wągrowiec
Sportspeople from Greater Poland Voivodeship
Polish female marathon runners
Polish female long-distance runners
Olympic athletes of Poland
Athletes (track and field) at the 2004 Summer Olympics
Athletes (track and field) at the 2008 Summer Olympics
Athletes (track and field) at the 2016 Summer Olympics
20th-century Polish women
21st-century Polish women